Benjamin Langer Bass (born August 14, 1968) is an American–Canadian actor. He is best known for his role as officer/detective Sam Swarek on the Global police television series Rookie Blue, which also aired on ABC.

Life and career

Bass was born in Baltimore, Maryland. At age 7, he moved with his family to Vancouver, British Columbia, Canada.  He speaks French fluently.

He started his television career by appearing in the show 21 Jump Street, and started his stage career when he appeared in Angry Housewives.  He was nominated for a Jessie Richardson Theatre Award for best supporting actor in Angry Housewives.  Also, he originated the stage role of the young Elvis Presley in Are You Lonesome Tonight at The Charlottetown Festival in Prince Edward Island.  Following that, he attended Theatre School at the London Academy of Music and Dramatic Art and L'École Internationale de Théâtre Jacques Lecoq in Paris. After returning to Canada, he appeared in television guest roles before becoming a regular cast member of the series Forever Knight as the 16th century Spanish vampire Javier Vachon.

He also appeared at the Stratford (Ontario) Festival as Christian in Cyrano de Bergerac and as the lead in In the Ring and also appeared as Petruchio in Taming of the Shrew at the Atlantic Theatre Festival in Nova Scotia.

Bass then played a lead character in the TV show The Eleventh Hour and was nominated for a Gemini Award for this role. He also starred in a TV miniseries Would Be Kings for which he received a second Gemini nomination. His next role as Sam Swarek in Rookie Blue garnered nominations for a Canadian Screen Award in 2014  and 2016. His film career includes A Cool Dry Place, Bride of Chucky, and The 6th Day.

Personal life 
On June 14, 2011, he married actress Laura Carswell. As of 2016, they are divorced.

Filmography

Awards

References

External links

American emigrants to Canada
American male film actors
American male television actors
Canadian male film actors
Canadian male television actors
Male actors from Vancouver
Male actors from Baltimore
1968 births
20th-century Canadian male actors
21st-century Canadian male actors
Living people